George Basil Theodore (born November 13, 1947) is a retired Major League Baseball player. He is probably best remembered for a brutal collision in left-center field with Don Hahn in a game against the Atlanta Braves at Shea Stadium on July 7, 1973. As a result of the collision, Ralph Garr scored an inside-the-park home run, and Theodore dislocated his hip and had to be carried off the field on a stretcher.

He is also remembered for his offbeat personality and idiosyncratic interviews. For example, he once remarked, "I've been trying transcendental meditation, and that helps me be passive and wait on the curve. I've got to find something else to hit the slider."

Theodore played in 2 games of the 1973 World Series during the Mets' tough loss in 7 games to the Oakland Athletics, where he finished with a .000 batting average in 2 plate appearances. This happened in games 2 and 4, where the Mets won both games.

After his baseball career, Theodore returned to the University of Utah and earned a Master of Social Work degree in 1978. He went on to work for 38 years as a counselor to elementary school students. In 2016, South Salt Lake Chamber of Commerce named him Educator of the Year.

On September 28, 2008, Theodore returned to Shea Stadium for the stadium's closing ceremony.

References

External links
, or Retrosheet, or Pura Pelota (Venezuelan Winter League) 

1947 births
Living people
American people of Greek descent
Baseball players from Salt Lake City
Major League Baseball first basemen
Major League Baseball outfielders
Marion Mets players
Memphis Blues players
Navegantes del Magallanes players
American expatriate baseball players in Venezuela
New York Mets players
Pompano Beach Mets players
Tidewater Tides players
Utah Utes baseball players
Visalia Mets players